Hellman is a neighborhood in the city of Long Beach, California.

Hellman Street/Craftsman Historic District
This area is located north of 7th Street, south of 10th Street, between Orange & Walnut Ave.

A high concentration of Craftsman bungalows, built for middle-class working families, remains intact today in this district. Secondary "contributing" structures are Spanish Colonial Revival and Victorian.

Isaias W. Hellman, businessman, financier and real estate developer prominent in Los Angeles and Long Beach, is credited with developing this neighborhood. Hellman Street bears his name.

Location
The greater Hellman neighborhood is bordered by Alamitos Avenue to the west, Anaheim Street to the north, Cherry Avenue to the east, and 7th Street to the south.

To the west of Hellman is the East Village and to the north is Cambodia Town, to the east is Rose Park and to the south is North Alamitos Beach (NABA).

See also
Neighborhoods of Long Beach, California

External links
 Hellman Street/Craftsman Historic District
 History of Hellman Street/Craftsman Historic District
 

Neighborhoods in Long Beach, California